Aiden Zhane is the stage name of Devin Lewis, an American drag performer most known for competing on the twelfth season of RuPaul's Drag Race.

Early life
Zhane was born in Howell and raised in Cohoctah, Michigan. She later moved to Acworth, Georgia

Career 
Aiden began her drag career in the early 2010s while living in Acworth, Georgia. She selected her stage name to represent "both ends of the spectrum" as A and Z are the first and last letters of the alphabet. She initially performed mostly at home as a self-described "bedroom queen" due to the lack of gay bars in her town. Despite proximity to Atlanta, Zhane experienced difficulty breaking into the city's drag scene early in her career and only occasionally performed there.

Aiden was announced as a cast member on season 12 of RuPaul's Drag Race on January 23, 2020. Zhane was eliminated on the sixth episode of the season, placing ninth in the competition. Along with Brita Filter, she was up for elimination following her performance in the Snatch Game challenge. Zhane's impersonation of Patricia Quinn from The Rocky Horror Picture Show was criticized by the show's judges and Quinn herself. She then lost a lip-sync against Brita to "Let It Go" from Frozen. Along with the other season 12 Drag Race contestants, Zhane appeared in Bring Back My Ghouls, a Halloween variety special produced by World of Wonder. Since appearing on Drag Race, Zhane has released two singles.

Personal life
Zhane was previously in a relationship with Saint (formerly St. Lucia), who competed on season 3 of The Boulet Brothers' Dragula. In an interview with Entertainment Weekly, Aiden described introducing Saint to drag.

Discography
 Singles
 "Boo!" (featuring Saint)
 "Gein"

Filmography

Television

Web series

References

External links

 Aiden Zhane at IMDb

Living people
1990 births
American drag queens
LGBT people from Georgia (U.S. state)
LGBT people from Michigan
Aiden Zhane